Joseph Paul Hudson (born September 29, 1970) is a former relief pitcher in Major League Baseball who played from  through  for the Boston Red Sox (1995–97) and Milwaukee Brewers (1998). He was selected by Boston in the 1992 draft out of the West Virginia University.
 
In a two-season career, Hudson posted a 6–7 record with a 4.82 ERA and two saves in 102 relief appearances, including 62 strikeouts, 53 walks, and 127.0 innings of work. He also pitched a shutout inning in the 1995 AL Division Series.

Following his majors career, Hudson pitched from 1998 to 2000 for the Boston, Milwaukee and Texas Triple-A affiliate teams.

Hudson's career was untimely ended by an injury to his pitching arm. He now lives happily in New Jersey with his wife, Kelly, and his four children.

External links

Boston Red Sox players
Milwaukee Brewers players
Major League Baseball pitchers
Baseball players from Pennsylvania
1970 births
Living people
West Virginia Mountaineers baseball players
Elmira Pioneers players
Louisville Redbirds players
Louisville RiverBats players
New Britain Red Sox players
Oklahoma RedHawks players
Pawtucket Red Sox players
Sarasota Red Sox players
Trenton Thunder players
Holy Cross Academy (New Jersey) alumni